Luc Menaše (3 April 1925 - 2 July 2002) was a Slovene art historian and prolific author of books on art history.

He won the Levstik Award in 1971 for his book  (European Art Historical Dictionary).

Selected published works

  (Museum of Fine Arts Budapest), 1983 
  (Artists and Their Company: Slovene Artistic Scene of the 20th Century Through Portraits and Caricatures), 1981
  (Famous People on Stamps), 1978
  (Ivana Kobilca), 1972
  (European Art Historical Dictionary), 1971
  (Portrait Painting in Western Europe), 1962
  (Gabrijel Stupica), 1959
  (The Self Portrait in Slovenia), 1958

References

Slovenian art historians
1925 births
2002 deaths
People from the Municipality of Zagorje ob Savi
Levstik Award laureates